Perkhuli is a Georgian predominantly male folk round dance. Of at least 20 versions of the dance, "multi-level" perkhuli is one of the most popular forms, performed by a group of dancers standing on the other group's shoulders, with music in 3/4 time. Another version of perkhuli consists of slow and fast rounds, danced to music in 4/4 time. The northwestern mountainous region of Svaneti is particularly rich in the perkhuli repertoire.

The dance was inscribed on the Intangible Cultural Heritage of Georgia list in 2013.

See also 
 Georgian dance

References 

Dances of Georgia (country)